Rebecca Fisher may refer to:

People
Becky Fisher Miss Texas Teen USA
Becky Fischer, American Pentecostal children's pastor
Rebecca Fisher (soccer), see Fredericksburg Impact
Rebecca Jane G. Fisher (1831–1926), American philanthropist and preservationist

Fictional characters
Rebecca Fisher, character in Doctors, played by Angela McHale
 Rebecca Nash, née Fisher, Home and Away character
Becca Fisher, character in Flash Forward